The Rural Electrification Act of 1936, enacted on May 20, 1936, provided federal loans for the installation of electrical distribution systems to serve isolated rural areas of the United States.

The funding was channeled through cooperative electric power companies, hundreds of which still exist today. These member-owned cooperatives purchased power on a wholesale basis and distributed it using their own network of transmission and distribution lines. The Rural Electrification Act was one of many New Deal proposals by President Franklin D. Roosevelt to remedy high unemployment during the Great Depression.

History
On May 11, 1935, President Roosevelt issued Executive Order 7037, which created the Rural Electrification Administration. In 1936, the Congress endorsed Roosevelt's action by passing the Rural Electrification Act. At the time the Rural Electrification Act was passed, electricity was commonplace in cities but largely unavailable in farms, ranches, and other rural places. Representative John E. Rankin and Senator George William Norris were supporters of the Rural Electrification Act, which was signed into law by Roosevelt on May 20, 1936.

Speaker of the House Sam Rayburn was a major proponent of the REA, which he helped pass in 1936 as Chairman of the House Interstate and Foreign Commerce Committee. Rayburn stated in 1959 that ninety percent of farm homes in the U.S. were electrified, compared to three percent in the early 1930s.

Technical issues
In the 1930s, the provision of power to remote areas was not thought to be economically feasible. A 2300 volt distribution system was then used in cities. This relatively low voltage could be carried only about 4 miles before the voltage drop became unacceptable. REA cooperatives used a 6900 volt distribution network, which could support much longer runs (up to about 40 miles). Despite requiring more expensive transformers at each home, the overall system cost was manageable.

Wiring homes and farms
REA crews traveled through the American countryside, bringing teams of electricians along with them.  The electricians added wiring to houses and barns  to utilize the newly available power provided by the line crews.  A standard REA installation in a house (post World War II) consisted of:

 A 60 amp, 230 volt fuse panel, with:
 A 60 amp range circuit
 A 20 amp kitchen circuit
 Two or three 15 amp lighting circuits

A ceiling-mounted light fixture was installed in each room, usually controlled by a single switch mounted near a door.  At most, one outlet was installed per room, since plug-connected appliances were expensive and uncommon.  Wiring was performed using type NM (nonmetallic sheathed cable), insulated with asbestos-reinforced rubber covered with jute and tar.

Many of these original installations still exist today, though most have been augmented to support a greater number and variety of appliances.

Later amendments
Some amendments to the Rural Electrification Act include:

 1944: loan terms increased to 35 years, the act is made permanent
 1949: extended the act to allow loans to telephone companies wishing to extend their connections to unconnected rural areas
 1993: Provisions to restructure the direct loan programs for rural electricity, telephone cooperatives, and energy conservation market
 December 8, 1993:  "North American Free Trade Agreement Implementation Act"—The "Buy American" provision to now include Mexico and Canada.
 2008: Provisions for access to rural broadband telecommunications network and rural internet
 2014: Pilot program for rural gigabit broadband network

See also
 Great Depression
 List of utility cooperatives
 Rural Utilities Service

References

External links
 Full text of the original Rural Electrification Act of 1936
 Rural Electrification Act of 1936 With Amendments as Approved through December 31, 2000

Acts of the 74th United States Congress
Electric cooperatives of the United States
New Deal legislation
Rural electrification in the United States
United States federal energy legislation